Athylia quadristigma is a species of beetle in the family Cerambycidae. It was described by Gressitt in 1940.

References

Athylia
Beetles described in 1940